Tun Pengiran Haji Ahmad Raffae bin Orang Kaya Pengiran Haji Omar (4 November 1908 – 18 March 1995) was the second Governor of the Malaysian state of Sabah.

Personal life
Tun Pengiran Haji Ahmad Raffae was born on 4 November 1908 at Sipitang, Beaufort, British North Borneo. His father was Orang Kaya Kaya Pengiran Haji Omar, a well known native officer who served as the first local Deputy Assistant District Officer of Putatan from 1915 until 1922.

Tun Pengiran Haji Ahmad Raffae married Toh Puan Dayang Hajah Kusnah binti Enche Sian and they were blessed with five children. His second wife was Dayang Supinah binti Abdullah.

Education
Tun Pengiran Haji Ahmad Raffae studied at Putatan English Special School and later at a school in Papar District (1918 - 1922). He later went to pursue his studies at a Malay Vernacular School in Sipitang until 1924.

Career
Upon completing his studies in 1930, Tun Pengiran Haji Ahmad Raffae joined the British North Borneo Civil Service as a Grade III Native Clerk on 1 May 1930. He was then appointed as Trainee Deputy Assistant District Officer of Beaufort in 1941 before being promoted to a permanent post in 1942.

During the Japanese Occupation, Tun Pengiran Haji Ahmad Raffae was appointed as Assistant District Officer of Beaufort. He was later appointed as Native Officer in Sipitang, Beaufort and Kota Belud. After the Japanese surrendered to the Allied Forces in 1945, Tun Pengiran Haji Ahmad Raffae served as Deputy Assistant District Officer of Tenom on 1 July 1946 before being promoted to Acting District Officer of Beaufort. He was later transferred to Mempakul in Sipitang, Kuala Penyu and Beaufort where he served as Deputy Assistant District Officer.

In 1954, Tun Pengiran Haji Ahmad Raffae was appointed as Deputy Assistant District Officer of Labuan and Penampang. He was later transferred to Beluran, one of the district in the Sandakan Division after serving as Assistant District Officer for eight months in 1955. From 1957 until 1962, Tun Pengiran Haji Ahmad Raffae served as Assistant District Officer in Beaufort, Kuala Penyu, Ranau and Pensiangan until his retirement from Civil Service in 1962 after a 32 years service.

Acting Governorship
From 1964 until 1965, Tun Pengiran Haji Ahmad Raffae served as Acting Yang di-Pertua Negara of Sabah under the governorship of Tun Mustapha. During his tenure as Acting Governor, Tun Pengiran Haji Ahmad Raffae plays an active role in the state development and also in maintaining peace and political stability among the different races and various ethnic groups in Sabah.

Governorship
On 16 September 1965, Tun Pengiran Haji Ahmad Raffae was appointed as the second Yang di-Pertua Negara of Sabah after the resignation of Tun Mustapha. He served as Governor for two terms until 16 September 1973.

Death
Tun Pengiran Haji Ahmad Raffae died due to old age at the Queen Elizabeth Hospital, Kota Kinabalu on 18 March 1995 at the age of 86. He died less than two months after his predecessor and political comrade, Tun Mustapha who died on 2 January 1995. He was buried at the Sabah State Heroes Mausoleum in the compound of Sabah State Mosque in Kota Kinabalu.

Honours

Honours of Malaysia
  : 
 Grand Commander of the Order of the Defender of the Realm (SMN) – Tun (1967)

References

1908 births
Malaysian people of Malay descent
1995 deaths
People from Sabah
Malaysian people of Bruneian descent
Malaysian Muslims
Yang di-Pertua Negeri of Sabah
Grand Commanders of the Order of the Defender of the Realm